Piotr Giza (born February 28, 1980) is a Polish former footballer who played as a central midfielder or attacking midfielder.

Career

Cracovia
Born in Kraków, Giza moved to Cracovia during the 2002–03 season and made his Polish League debut on July 30, 2004 against Zagłębie Lubin. After a falling out with his manager Stefan Majewski he stopped being included in the squad, even though he was generally considered one of the best offensive midfielders of the league.

Legia Warsaw
In 2007 after five years at Cracovia, he decided to play for Legia Warsaw on a loan deal. Though sometimes criticized for his poor performances and low goal count Legia decided to make the deal permanent for the 2008–09 season.

Cracovia
He returned to Cracovia on 13 December 2010. He was released half year later.

International
Giza has been capped five times for Poland.

References

External links
 
 

1980 births
Living people
Footballers from Kraków
Association football midfielders
Polish footballers
Ekstraklasa players
Legia Warsaw players
MKS Cracovia (football) players
2006 FIFA World Cup players
Poland international footballers